The Conch Awards recognise UK companies and individuals who have made outstanding contributions in the field of audio post production.

The Awards are held annually in London, England and are funded by the UK Screen Association.

The first Conch Awards were held in 2006.

Categories

People

 Film Re-Recording Mixer of the Year
This award recognises the UK's best re-recording mixer working in film.
 Film Sound Editor of the Year
This award is given to a person based in the UK (i.e. UK resident) that recognises his or her excellence in the field of film. The judging panel will take into consideration a number of factors such as: career and quality of work, contribution to the craft and audio profession.
The following professions within the film industry can apply: editor, designer, dialogue editor, supervising sound editor.

 Most Promising Newcomer
This award recognises the most promising new British talent in the audio post-production industry in any field. This person must have been involved in the creative side of the industry for less than 3 years. This award will be determined by the audio committee.

 TV Dubbing Mixer of the Year
This award recognises the UK's best dubbing mixer working in TV.

 Sound Design & Editorial Team
For either film, TV or commercials. This award recognises a company whose predominant activity is in Sound Design and/or editorial. The award will recognise the team and the body of work. For either film, TV or commercials.

 Production Sound Mixer
This award will be presented to the UK's leading production sound mixer.

 TV Sound Recordist
This award recognises the UKs best sound recordist working in TV

 TV Sound Editor of the Year
This award is given to a person based in the UK (i.e. UK resident) that recognises his/her excellence in the field of television. The judging panel will take into consideration a number of factors such as: career and quality of work, contribution to the craft and audio profession.

The following professions within the TV industry can apply: editor, designer, dialogue editor, supervising sound editor.

Projects

 Audio on TV Drama
The winner of this award will be a programme that has shown audio excellence in TV drama. This category is open to both British and International TV drama providing that the audio post-production has (in full or part) been carried out in the UK.

 Audio on TV Entertainment
The winner of this award will have shown audio excellence in a British or International TV entertainment programme where the audio post-production has (in full or part) been carried out in the UK.

 Audio on TV/Film Documentary
The winner of this award will be a programme that has shown audio excellence in a British or International TV or Film documentary where the audio post-production has (in full or part) been carried out in the UK.

 Film Soundtrack of the Year - over £10 million
This award recognises sound excellence in a high budget feature film (>£10m) where the audio post-production has (in full or part) been carried out in the UK.

 Film Soundtrack of the Year - under £10 million
This award recognises sound excellence in a low budget feature film (<£10m) where the audio post-production has (in full or part) been carried out in the UK.

 Facilities
 Commercial / Promo Facility of the Year
This award will be given to the Commercial/Promo Sound Facility that is deemed to have delivered the most interesting, challenging or creative work throughout the year.

 Film Mix Facility of the Year
This award will be given to the Film Sound Facility that is deemed to have delivered the most interesting, challenging or creative work throughout the year. (It includes ADR, foley or mixing studios).

 TV Mix Facility of the Year
This award will be given to the TV Sound Facility that is deemed to have delivered the most interesting, challenging or creative work throughout the year.

Winners

2006

External links
Official Conch Awards website
UK Screen Association website

Awards established in 2006
British film awards